North Weeki Wachee is a census-designated place (CDP) in Hernando County, Florida, United States. The population was 8,524 at the 2010 census, up from 4,253 at the 2000 census.

Geography
North Weeki Wachee is located in west-central Hernando County at  (28.543227, -82.559908). It is bordered to the south by the communities of High Point, Spring Hill, and Weeki Wachee. U.S. Route 19 passes through the community, leading north  to Homosassa Springs and south  to Hudson. State Road 50 runs along part of the southern edge of North Weeki Wachee, leading east  to Brooksville, the Hernando County seat.

Demographics

As of the census of 2000, there were 4,253 people, 1,891 households, and 1,406 families residing in the CDP. The racial makeup of the CDP was 96.61% White, 0.99% African American, 0.40% Native American, 0.54% Asian, 0.02% Pacific Islander, 0.59% from other races, and 0.85% from two or more races. Hispanic or Latino of any race were 4.70% of the population.

There were 1,891 households, out of which 16.4% had children under the age of 18 living with them, 65.4% were married couples living together, 6.1% had a female householder with no husband present, and 25.6% were non-families. 21.7% of all households were made up of individuals, and 12.8% had someone living alone who was 65 years of age or older.  The average household size was 2.24 and the average family size was 2.56.

In the CDP, the population was spread out, with 15.2% under the age of 18, 3.5% from 18 to 24, 17.8% from 25 to 44, 28.9% from 45 to 64, and 34.7% who were 65 years of age or older.  The median age was 56 years. For every 100 females, there were 94.7 males.  For every 100 females age 18 and over, there were 91.8 males.

The median income for a household in the CDP was $31,985, and the median income for a family was $37,694. Males had a median income of $33,594 versus $21,845 for females. The per capita income for the CDP was $22,186.  About 3.8% of families and 5.9% of the population were below the poverty line, including 6.2% of those under age 18 and 4.9% of those age 65 or over.

References

Census-designated places in Hernando County, Florida
Census-designated places in Florida